The Statistical Center of Iran (abbreviated as SCI) is the main organization for statistics in Iran. It is administered and funded by the Government of Iran.

SCI was established in 1965 by legislation from the National Consultative Assembly.

National Population Censuses
SCI is the national body in charge of planning, performing and publishing national statistics on population and housing. The first nation-wide status belongs to 1955. Since then, SCI has run eight national statistics programs, including:
 1st National Population and Housing Census, 1956
 2nd National Population and Housing Census, 1966
 3rd National Population and Housing Census, 1976
 4th National Population and Housing Census, 1986
 4th-2 National Population and Housing Census, 1991
 5th National Population and Housing Census, 1996
 6th National Population and Housing Census, 2006
 7th National Population and Housing Census, 2011
 8th National Population and Housing Census, 2016

International cooperation
During 2004-2007, the Statistical Center of Iran was selected as a member of the UN Statistical Commission. It was also selected as a member in the Governing Council of Statistical Institution for Asia and the Pacific (SIAP) affiliated to ESCAP during 2005-2010.

See also
Demographics of Iran
International rankings of Iran
Economy of Iran
National Organization for Civil Registration of Iran

References

Government agencies of Iran
National statistical services
Government agencies established in 1965
1965 establishments in Iran